Khariar College, officially Khariar (Autonomous) College, was founded on Vijaya Dashami, in October 1977.It got permanent government concurrence in 1979 for IA, 1980 for BA & 1986–87 for Science & Commerce.  The college is accredited by NACC with grade ['B'] certification and got autonomous status from the session 2012. The college is affiliated to Kalahandi University, which prepares undergraduate students for regular three years bachelor courses on Arts (B.A), Science (B.Sc), Commerce (B.Com). The college has also center for Indira Gandhi National Open University for distance learners.

History 

The college began with only 67 students. It got government concurrence for IA (1979), BA (1980) and Science & Commerce (1986). In 1986, the college shifted to its present new building, built on a 30.25-acre plot donated by RANI SAHIBA Soubhagya Manjari Devi.

Courses offered 
At present, the college has Arts, Science and Commerce at the +2 & +3 level with honours in all affiliated subjects.

There is scope to acquire Certificate Course in addition to Degree and Diploma ie Diploma in Journalism and Mass communication, Diploma in Human Rights, Diploma in computer Application 

From the session 2019–20, the college also offer P.G. course in Odia, Hindi, Political Science and Chemistry.

Departments 
Faculty of Arts

 Dept. Of Odia
 Dept. Of Hindi
 Dept. Of English
 Dept. Of Education
 Dept. Of Economics
 Dept. Of History
 Dept. Of Philosophy 
 Dept. Of Political Science
 Dept. Of Archaeology & Museology

Faculty of Science

 Dept.  Of Physics
 Dept. Of Chemistry
 Dept. Of Mathematics
 Dept. Of Botany
 Dept. Of Zoology
 Dept. of Computer Science

Faculty of Commerce

 Dept. Of Commerce

References

External links
 

Universities and colleges in Odisha
Nuapada district
1977 establishments in Orissa
Educational institutions established in 1977